Hejlsberg is a surname. Notable people with the surname include:

Anders Hejlsberg (born 1960), Danish software engineer
Martin Hejlsberg (born 1963), Danish sailor

Danish-language surnames